Robert Raymond (born 14 April 1930) is a Belgian former cyclist. He competed in the 4,000 metres team pursuit event at the 1952 Summer Olympics.

References

External links
 

1930 births
Possibly living people
Belgian male cyclists
Olympic cyclists of Belgium
Cyclists at the 1952 Summer Olympics
Sportspeople from Namur (city)
Cyclists from Namur (province)